Monica Inunak Ell-Kanayuk is a Canadian politician, who was elected to represent the district of Iqaluit West in the Legislative Assembly of Nunavut in a by-election on September 12, 2011.

Prior to her election as an MLA, she was a director of the Inuit Broadcasting Corporation.

References

External links
. Biography at the Legislative Assembly of Nunavut

Living people
Women government ministers of Canada
Members of the Executive Council of Nunavut
Members of the Legislative Assembly of Nunavut
Inuit politicians
People from Iqaluit
Women MLAs in Nunavut
21st-century Canadian women politicians
Canadian Inuit women
21st-century Canadian politicians
Deputy premiers of Nunavut
Year of birth missing (living people)
Inuit from the Northwest Territories
Inuit from Nunavut